Liotia atomus is a species of small sea snail, a marine gastropod mollusk, in the family Liotiidae.

Description
The diameter of the shell is 1.5 mm. The somewhat solid shell is narrowly umbilicated. It is greenish and a little shining. It is obliquely longitudinally striate. The 4½ slightly convex whorls enlarge rapidly. The body whorl is subangulated at the base. The umbilical area is longitudinally crispate. The continuous peristome is thickened.

Distribution
This marine species occurs off Suez, Red Sea.

References

 Dekker, H. & Orlin, Z. (2000). Checklist of Red Sea Mollusca . Spirula. 47 Supplement : 1-46

External links
 To World Register of Marine Species

atomus
Gastropods described in 1869